Anastasia Nikolaevna Klimova (born 19 September 1994) is a footballer who plays as a goalkeeper for Russian club Yenisey. Born in Ukraine, she represents the Armenia women's national team.

International career
Klimova capped for Armenia at senior level in two friendlies against Lithuania on 4 and 6 March 2020.

See also
List of Armenia women's international footballers

References

1994 births
Living people
Women's association football goalkeepers
Ukrainian women's footballers
Footballers from Odesa
WFC Lehenda-ShVSM Chernihiv players
Russian Women's Football Championship players
Ukrainian expatriate women's footballers
Ukrainian expatriate sportspeople in Georgia (country)
Expatriate footballers in Georgia (country)
Ukrainian expatriate sportspeople in Russia
Expatriate women's footballers in Russia
Ukrainian expatriate sportspeople in Belarus
Expatriate women's footballers in Belarus
Ukrainian expatriate sportspeople in Armenia
Ukrainian emigrants to Armenia
Naturalized citizens of Armenia
Armenian women's footballers
Armenia women's international footballers
FC Martve players